Robert Trotter Hermon-Hodge, 1st Baron Wyfold,  (23 September 1851 – 3 June 1937) was a British Conservative politician.

Born Robert Trotter Hodge, he was the son of G W Hodge of Newcastle upon Tyne. He was educated at Clifton College and Worcester College, Oxford. In 1877 he married Frances Caroline Hermon, only daughter of Edward Hermon, Member of Parliament (MP) for Preston. In 1903 he added her surname to his own to become "Hermon-Hodge".

Parliamentary career
He entered politics in 1884, when he was adopted as Conservative candidate for the Wallingford seat. The seat was abolished by the Redistribution of Seats Act 1885, when he contested the new seat of Accrington in Lancashire, winning it first on the next general election, called in 1886, his first return to the Commons. He served one term losing the seat at the next election in 1892, and narrowly failing to be re-elected in an 1893 by-election.

Hodge gained his longest spell in the Commons from the 1895 general election as MP for the Southern or Henley Division of Oxfordshire. He held the seat in 1900 and was defeated in the Liberal landslide of 1906. His  years for this seat proved longer than the  total years he served in three separate chunks at other times. It was announced that he would receive a baronetcy in the 1902 Coronation Honours list published on 26 June 1902 for the (subsequently postponed) coronation of King Edward VII, and on 24 July 1902 he was created a Baronet, of Wyfold Court in the Parish of Checkendon in the county of Oxford.

He returned to the Commons for a third time when he won a by-election in March 1909 at Croydon. Re-elected at the ensuing poll in January 1910, he stood down for the election in December of the same year.

In May 1917, Valentine Fleming, the sitting MP for Henley, was killed fighting on the Western Front. An election was announced and Hermon-Hodge was returned unopposed for his old seat at the by-election in June. He retired from parliament at the post-war general election in 1918. In May 1919 he was raised to the peerage as Baron Wyfold, of Accrington in the County Palatine of Lancaster and participated in the Lords 34 times, all before 1931. His son did so 13 times all in the 1937-1938 period.

Life outside parliament
He enjoyed the life of a country gentleman at the family estate of Wyfold Court, near Reading, Berkshire. He was an enthusiastic sportsman, being a member of various hunts in Berkshire and South Oxfordshire. He also participated in deer-stalking, shooting and fishing. He attended the Henley Regatta each year, and is remembered in the name of the Wyfold Challenge Cup. He was also a leading freemason and was for thirty years a member of the Queen's Own Oxfordshire Hussars. He was honorary colonel of the regiment at the time of his death.

He had seven sons, two of whom died in the First World War, and one daughter. His wife died in 1929, and Lord Wyfold died in June 1937, aged 85.

Arms

References

External links 
 

1851 births
1937 deaths
People educated at Clifton College
Alumni of Worcester College, Oxford
Barons in the Peerage of the United Kingdom
Conservative Party (UK) MPs for English constituencies
Deputy Lieutenants of Oxfordshire
Politics of the London Borough of Croydon
UK MPs 1886–1892
UK MPs 1895–1900
UK MPs 1900–1906
UK MPs 1906–1910
UK MPs 1910
UK MPs 1910–1918
UK MPs who were granted peerages
Politics of Hyndburn
Queen's Own Oxfordshire Hussars officers
Barons created by George V